The Santa Ynez Valley is located in Santa Barbara County, California,  between the Santa Ynez Mountains to the south and the San Rafael Mountains to the north. The Santa Ynez River flows through the valley from east to west. The Santa Ynez Valley is separated from the Los Alamos Valley, to the northwest, by the Purisima Hills, and from the Santa Maria Valley by the Solomon Hills. The Santa Rita Hills separate the Santa Ynez Valley from the Santa Rita and Lompoc Valleys to the west.

The valley has a population of about 20,000 residents living in the communities of Solvang, Los Olivos, Santa Ynez, Buellton, and Ballard.

Culture
The 2004 film Sideways was set (and shot on location) in the Santa Ynez Valley. Since then, visits from tourists looking to recreate the experiences of the fictional characters Miles and Jack, have become common. Fans of the movie can often be seen making a pilgrimage from the Buellton Days Inn to the Hitching Post restaurant. Other movies that have been filmed in the Santa Ynez Valley include indie film "Flying Lessons" featuring Michael O’Neill, Maggie Grace, and Hal Holbrook, “Michael Jackson: The Untold Story of Neverland", “Uncorked” /Hallmark/Larry Levinson; “Bad Girls”; “It’s Complicated”/Universal; Nitro Circus/MTV; “Inside Luxury Travel”; “The Othersiders”/Red Varden Studios;“More to Love”; “Back in Wedding Shape”; “You’re Hired”; “Kathy Griffin Season 2”; and “Somewhere” Movie locations

An estate in the Valley, five miles from the town of Los Olivos, California, was one of the filming locations for a 1983 video of the song "Say Say Say", featuring Michael Jackson, Paul McCartney and Linda McCartney. At the time, it was called Sycamore Valley Ranch. According to La Toya Jackson, Michael expressed interest in someday buying the property. In 1988, he would do so, renaming it Neverland Ranch. The singer sold the property prior to his death and in 2017, the estate, again Sycamore Valley Ranch (5225 Figueroa Mountain Road, Los Olivos), was for sale at an asking price of $67 million.

Politics
The Santa Ynez Valley is part of Santa Barbara County's Third Supervisorial District, whose voters are registered 39% Democratic and 31% Republican; however, registered voters within the Valley's two incorporated cities, Buellton and Solvang, are approximately 31% Democratic and 45% Republican, reflecting the greater Valley's more conservative political constituency. The Valley, geographically located at the center of Santa Barbara County and partially surrounded by the Los Padres National Forest, is sometimes regarded as more politically aligned with northern Santa Barbara County and would have been included in the proposed Mission County under "Measure H," rejected by 81% of County voters in the June 6, 2006 Direct Primary election. Numerous smart growth-type coalitions have formed such as the Santa Ynez Valley Alliance, Preservation of Los Olivos (POLO), Preservation of Santa Ynez (POSY), WeWatch, and the Santa Ynez Valley Concerned Citizens. These groups' stated mission is the preservation of the Santa Ynez Valley.

Economy

The economy of the Santa Ynez Valley is driven by agriculture (particularly viticulture), the equine industry, and tourism.

Agriculture
The wine industry is a major part of the Santa Ynez Valley's economy. The Santa Ynez Valley Visitors Association lists over 70 wineries and tasting rooms on their website. Besides grapes, the valley also has numerous apple farms, many of them with roadside apple stands or "pick your own" programs. It is the location of the Santa Ynez Valley American Viticultural Area.

Equine
Horses are seen throughout the valley and a historic Western atmosphere is kept alive. Notable ranches include Monty Roberts' Flag Is Up Farms, River Edge Farm (thoroughbreds), and the nationally known Alamo Pintado Equine Medical Center.
This valley is noted for having over 52 different breeds of horses, plus 28 veterinarians.

Tourism
Tourists often visit the valley for its attractions including numerous art galleries, wine tasting rooms, and antique stores as well as resorts such as the Alisal Guest Ranch, Lake Cachuma, PCPA's Theatrefest, and the Chumash Casino. Because of good weather year round, many participate in outdoor activities such as hiking in the nearby Los Padres National Forest or bicycling throughout the valley.

Education

 Allan Hancock College: Solvang Campus
 Santa Ynez Valley Union High School
 Los Olivos Elementary School
 Ballard Elementary School
 Olive Grove Charter School
 Dunn School
 Midland School
 The Family School
 Santa Ynez School
 College School (Charter School)
 Santa Ynez Valley Christian Academy
 Jonata Middle School
 Oak Valley Elementary School
 Solvang Elementary School

Transportation

Major highways
 U.S. Route 101
 State Route 154
 State Route 246

Public transportation
 Santa Ynez Valley Transit provides service to the communities of Buellton, Los Olivos, Santa Ynez, and Solvang. Route A is a clockwise-oriented route through the four communities, traveling along State Route 246 as its primary thoroughfare. Route B transit service circulates along the same route, in a counterclockwise direction.

Airports

Notable residents
Notable present or past residents include

 Robert Carradine
 Jimmy Connors
 Jake Copass
 John Corbett
 David Crosby
 Bo Derek
 Bob Eubanks
 Brooks Firestone
 John Forsythe
 Dan Gerber
 Richard A. Harris
 Dan Henry
 Sandy Hill
 Michael Jackson (Neverland Ranch)
 Ed Joyce
 Kelly Le Brock
 Peter Lewis
 Tom Leykis
 Olivia Newton-John
 Marty Paich
 Fess Parker
 Dolly Parton
 Ronald Reagan (Rancho del Cielo)
 Monty Roberts
 Todd Rogers
 Steven Seagal
 Edie Sedgwick
 Doc Severinsen
 Steven Spielberg
 Bernie Taupin
 Noah Wyle
Efrem Zimbalist Jr.

See also
 California wine

References

External links

 Activities in the Valley
 The Danish Soul of That Town in 'Sideways'
 The Santa Ynez Valley Visitors Association

 
Valleys of Santa Barbara County, California
California wine
Geography of Santa Barbara County, California
Valleys of California